Brickellia cavanillesii is a Mexican species of flowering plants in the family Asteraceae. It is widespread across much of Mexico from Chiapas north as far as Durango.

The species is named for Spanish botanist Antonio José Cavanilles 1745 – 1804.

References

External links
Photo of herbarium specimen of Brickellia cavanillesii, collected in México State
Heriba del becerro, Brickellia cavanillesii  video in Spanish, explaining medicinal uses of this and certain other Mexican plants
Plantas medicinales de México, Priodigiosa, Brickellia cavanillesii in Spanish

cavanillesii
Flora of Mexico
Plants described in 1817